Eva Svenby (born 11 June 1969) is a female Swedish former professional squash player who represented Sweden. She reached a career-high world ranking of 12 in March 1982.

Svenby was born in Lund, and was Swedish champion a record 9 times.

References

1969 births
Living people
Female squash players
Swedish sportswomen
Swedish squash players
Sportspeople from Lund